Barbee is an unincorporated community in Tippecanoe Township, Kosciusko County, in the U.S. state of Indiana.

History
A post office was established at Barbee in 1898, and closed that same year. William Barbee was a pioneer settler in the area.

Geography

References

Unincorporated communities in Kosciusko County, Indiana
Unincorporated communities in Indiana